Serpents of the Light is the fourth full-length album by American death metal band Deicide. It was released on October 21, 1997, by Roadrunner Records.

Glen Benton stated that "Serpents of the Light" was written "about a friend of mine that died".

Track listing

Personnel
Glen Benton – bass, vocals
Eric Hoffman – guitars
Brian Hoffman – guitars
Steve Asheim – drums

Production
Deicide – production
Scott Burns – production

References

1997 albums
Deicide (band) albums
Roadrunner Records albums
Albums produced by Scott Burns (record producer)
Albums recorded at Morrisound Recording